Daniel Erwin Soder (born June 24, 1983) is an American comedian, actor, and radio personality. He is best known for his frequent appearances on MTV2's Guy Code and as Mafee on the Showtime drama series Billions. He co-hosted The  Bonfire with fellow comedian Big Jay Oakerson on Sirius XM from 2015 to 2023.

Early life
Daniel E. Soder was born in Hartford, Connecticut, on June 24, 1983. He is of Irish descent. He was raised in Aurora, Colorado. While he was in high school, his father died after a long illness; two years later, his sister died in a car crash. He became close friends with future Miami Dolphins head coach Mike McDaniel while the two were growing up. He began performing stand-up comedy while a student at the University of Arizona, graduating in 2005 with degrees in journalism and political science. A year later, he moved to New York City to further pursue his career.

Career
Soder has appeared on Comedy Central's The Half Hour, Conan, Cum Town, Opie and Anthony, The Anthony Cumia Show, MTV2's Guy Code and Guy Court, Fox Sports 1's Garbage Time with Katie Nolan, and the You Know What Dude! podcast with Robert Kelly. After the firing of Anthony Cumia from the Opie & Anthony Show, Soder was a frequent guest and "third mic" on Opie with Jim Norton, formerly on the Faction Talk channel on Sirius Satellite Radio. On July 27, 2015, Soder along with fellow stand-up comedian Big Jay Oakerson began their two-hour live radio talk show, The Bonfire, on SiriusXM's Comedy Central Radio channel airing every Monday through Thursday (previously Mondays and Wednesdays) from 6-8pm EST. As of March 1, 2021, the show has aired on Faction Talk from 5-7pm EST after Comedy Central Radio ceased production on all of its talk shows. On Feb 22 2023, it was announced that Soder is leaving The Bonfire and will be replaced by comedian Robert Kelly.

Soder appeared in multiple episodes as a guest star on Inside Amy Schumer beginning in 2014, and had a minor appearance in Schumer's film Trainwreck (2015). On May 21, 2016, Soder released his first hour long special on Comedy Central titled Not Special.

On March 19, 2016, Dan Soder made a special guest appearance on the popular wrestling podcast Wrestling Soup, and has a recurring role on the Showtime drama series Billions. In late 2016, Soder was cast in the comedy Drunk Parents (2019), starring Alec Baldwin and Salma Hayek.

In July 2017, Netflix released the first season of its new stand-up comedy series The Standups, in which Soder had a 30-minute set on the final episode.

Filmography

References

External links
Official website

1983 births
American male comedians
American people of Irish descent
American stand-up comedians
Living people
People from Aurora, Colorado
People from Denver
Male actors from Hartford, Connecticut
University of Arizona alumni
21st-century American comedians
Comedians from Colorado
Television personalities from Connecticut